Luis Iribarren Cavanilles (19 February 1902 – 4 May 1984) was a Spanish football player and manager who managed the Spain national football team in four matches between 1953 and 1954. 

Iribarren's first match in charge was a friendly against Sweden, which ended in a 2-2 draw. Iribarren then oversaw Spain's 1954 FIFA World Cup qualification matches against Turkey. Spain won the first leg of the tie 4-1 in Madrid on 6 January 1954, but lost the return match 1-0 in Istanbul on 14 March 1954. As goal difference had not yet been introduced by FIFA, a play-off match was required, which took place at the Stadio Olimpico in Rome on 17 March 1954. The match ended in a 2-2 draw, with Turkey advancing after drawing of lots.

Iribarren was a qualified dentist and the younger brother of the notable civil engineer, Ramón Iribarren.

Managerial statistics

References

1902 births
1984 deaths
Spanish footballers
Spain national football team managers
Spanish football managers
Real Unión footballers
People from Irun
Sportspeople from Irun
People from Gipuzkoa